Love Put a Song in My Heart is a compilation album of pop and country songs recorded by Debby Boone from 1977 to 1981 culled from her first five albums on the Warner Bros./Curb label.  The compilation included Boone's number-one pop and AC hit, "You Light Up My Life", and her number-one country hit, "Are You on the Road to Lovin' Me Again".

Track listing 
 It'll Be Him (from "Savin' It Up")
 Isn't That Just Like Love (from "Savin' It Up")
 "Love Put a Song in My Heart" (from "Love Has No Reason")
 Take It Like a Woman (from "Love Has No Reason")
 You Light Up My Life (from "You Light Up My Life")
 "Are You on the Road to Lovin' Me Again" (from "Love Has No Reason")
 I Wish That I Could Hurt That Way Again (from "Love Has No Reason")
 Breakin' in a Brand New Broken Heart (from "Debby Boone")

1988 compilation albums
Debby Boone albums